Sooty & Co. is a British children's television series, created and presented by Matthew Corbett, produced by Granada Television, and aired on ITV from 6 September 1993 to 14 December 1998. It is the sequel to the children's programme The Sooty Show, which had concluded in 1992, retaining the sitcom format, and focuses on the misadventures of Sooty, Sweep, Soo, Little Cousin Scampi, and Matthew as they try to run a bric a brac shop in Manchester. Episodes were mainly filmed at Granada's main studio in Manchester and around the city, though some episodes were filmed outside of Manchester, including within Scotland, Ireland, and Spain.

The programme was the last major children's show for Corbett to front before he retired in 1998, having sold the rights to Sooty and the other characters to his successors Richard Cadell and Liana Bridges, guest stars during a number of episodes in the final series. Following its conclusion, Sooty & Co was succeeded by a new Sooty TV series, entitled Sooty Heights, in 1999.

Premise
Following the conclusion of The Sooty Show, Matthew Corbett sells up the cottage, before buying a bric-a-brac shop in Manchester for himself (which he actually inherited the shop from a distant aunty), and the puppets Sooty, Sweep, Soo and Little Cousin Scampi, to run in which they buy and sell anything and everything, but with little luck. Like its predecessor, each episode sees Matthew, Sooty and the others being involved in hijinks ranging from trying to make money with the shop, or dealing with an issue that they have to sort out, and included moments of singing songs and providing educational insights. In some episodes, the characters travelled outside of Manchester as part of an episode's plot – one example involved the group going off on holiday to Spain.

Brenda Longman, the voice of Soo, was given a physical role in the programme as a regular character named Mo – a market seller whom Matthew tends to have difficulty in selling her anything, and always being made to buy something from her. Alongside the inclusion of a regular character, Sooty & Co also introduced a new element to the Sooty franchise in the form of a specially designed campervan for Sooty and his friends to travel around in, while a variety of guest stars took part in the programme, including Jack Dee, Paul Zerdin, Harry Hill, Neil Buchanan, and Jim Bowen. In the sixth and final series, as Corbett prepared for his retirement, several episodes featured the appearance of Richard Cadell, Corbett's successor to the rights on Sooty, and Liana Bridges, Cadell's partner in the subsequent programme Sooty Heights, as junior shop staff, mainly to test how they would fare with young viewers after the programme's conclusion.

Cast
 Matthew Corbett – The programme's presenter, who maintained many aspects of The Sooty Show in Sooty & Co, including the sitcom format, various gags, his role as narrator in scenes involving Sooty and/or the other puppets, and his on-screen character.
 Brenda Longman – The voice of Soo on the programme and Mo 'from market'. Prior to Sooty & Co, Longman never assumed a regular character when she was given the physical role  as Mo in a number of episodes of The Sooty Show, until Corbett devised the new programme. Longman devised the character to be a con artist and constant source of misery for Corbett whenever she turned up, with a running gag being that she was never sold anything by him and always cost him money instead. Her catchphrase when entering the shop was 'Only me, Mo from market'. 
 Connie Creighton - Series regular. Played auntie Connie. Connie was also the main presenter for the Sooty live shows produced by Corbett around this time. Her character was brought over from The Sooty Show and was often used to fool or deceive Mo's character leading them to quarrel about something trivia. 
 Richard Cadell – Guest presenter on the programme during the sixth (and last) series. As Corbett was set for retirement at the conclusion of the programme in 1998, Cadell was invited to take part in the programme in order to gauge the reaction of young viewers, and appeared in a number of episodes during the final series, though had no narrator role, as Corbett handled these.
 Liana Bridges – Guest presenter on the programme during the sixth (and last) series. Like Cadell, she appeared in a number of episodes during the final series.

Episodes

Controversy
A particular controversial episode of the show was "Soo's Babies", where  Soo pretended to be pregnant. It received complaints from viewers, was reported in the national press, and made E4's Top 20 "Most Controversial TV Programmes" at #20. On E4's show, Brenda Longman (who plays 'Mo' and voices 'Soo' in the show), said the idea came about because Matthew tended to write for his daughter.

Matthew stated that he recalled his daughter wandering into his room with a pillow up her jumper, saying she was going to have a baby. He also said how it was a sort of educational piece.

In the same episode, Yvonne (played by Beverly Hills) says she feels she has got the whole of the Manchester Football Team inside her, a joke that could be seen as sexual innuendo. The joke would later be said by Soo. In the show's defence, Longman stated how the show was also watched by parents as well as children, and that there were jokes in it for parents. Uri Geller said the story was played in a 'nice' and 'humorous' way.

Home media releases

External links
 Classic Sooty Show Episodes on YouTube
 

British television shows featuring puppetry
ITV children's television shows
Television shows set in Manchester
Television series set in shops
British children's adventure television series
British children's comedy television series
British children's musical television series
1990s British children's television series
1990s British workplace comedy television series
1993 British television series debuts
1998 British television series endings
Television series by ITV Studios
Coronation Street
Television shows produced by Granada Television
ITV comedy
English-language television shows
Television shows set in Greater Manchester
Sooty
Television series about bears